Now and Then is a 1995 American coming-of-age comedy-drama film directed by Lesli Linka Glatter and starring Christina Ricci, Rosie O'Donnell, Thora Birch, Melanie Griffith, Gaby Hoffmann, Demi Moore, Ashleigh Aston Moore, and Rita Wilson. The supporting cast features Hank Azaria, Janeane Garofalo, Cloris Leachman, and Bonnie Hunt, among many others. The plot follows four women who recount a pivotal summer they shared together as adolescents in 1970.

It was filmed largely in the Country Walk subdivision off Coffee Bluff Road in Savannah, Georgia (called Shelby, Indiana in the movie), using the Gaslight Addition and Old Town Cemetery, highlighting the downtown area. Additional filming was done in Statesboro, Georgia in locations including the Bulloch County Court House (also featured in the film 1969) and the building now housing the Averitt Center for the Arts.

Though the film received unfavorable reviews upon release, it was a box office success, grossing $37.5 million against a $12 million budget. The film is considered a cult classic for its depiction of girlhood and centering of female friendships.

Plot
In 1991, four women and childhood friends reunite in their hometown of Shelby, Indiana. They include sci-fi author Samantha Albertson, glitzy actress Tina "Teeny" Tercell, dry-humored gynecologist Dr. Roberta Martin, and content homemaker Chrissy DeWitt, who is heavily pregnant and expecting to give birth to her first child any day.

The story flashes back to 1970 as Samantha recounts the memorable summer shared by them as young adolescents. Twelve-year-old Samantha seeks to earn enough money to purchase a tree house to place in Chrissy's backyard in their affluent suburban neighborhood, the Gaslight Addition.

Each of the four girls is going through her own individual struggles. Samantha’s parents are in the midst of a divorce, Teeny is in pursuit of stardom and is boy-crazy, tomboy Roberta experiences embarrassment due to her developing breasts, and Chrissy is naive about sex and life in general due to her mother's overprotectiveness.

Motivated by Samantha's interest in the occult, the girls regularly sneak out at night to hold seances in the cemetery. During one, a cracked tombstone convinces them they have resurrected the spirit of a young boy identified only as Dear Johnny, who died in 1945. This sets the girls on a quest to find out what happened to him.

At a library in a nearby town, Roberta discovers an article about her mother’s death due to a car accident: she was hit head on, trapped in her car for an hour, and then later died of massive head trauma and internal bleeding—facts previously unknown to her. Samantha finds an obituary that briefly mentions Johnny and his mother tragically dying, but many of the pages are missing, leaving their cause of their deaths a mystery.

Meanwhile, the girls get into all sorts of other adventures, including an ongoing prank war with a group of neighborhood boys called the Wormer brothers and a fight at a softball game after a local boy insults Roberta. Roberta has her first kiss with Scott Wormer and makes him swear not to tell anyone.

One night after some tension prompted by her mother dating someone new, Samantha storms out of her home. She and Teeny hang out in the tree house display at the store, where Samantha confides her parents are getting a divorce. Teeny comforts her and breaks her favorite necklace in two, giving one half to Samantha as a "best friends for life" bracelet.

A thunderstorm breaks out as the girls head home, and Samantha accidentally drops her bracelet in a storm drain. She nearly drowns trying to retrieve it, but is rescued by Crazy Pete, a local old man who only comes out at night to ride his bike. This causes the girls to change their impression of Crazy Pete, who admits he only goes out at night because he prefers not to be around people.

Later, at Samantha’s grandmother’s, as she refuses to tell them what happened to Johnny, they sneak into the attic. They discover old newspapers that reveal Jonathan Sims and his mother, Beverly Anne, were shot and killed when they interrupted a burglary; father and husband, Peter, came home to find their bodies.

Roberta becomes upset and angry that two innocent people were killed and that her mother died violently, contrary to what she was told. Samantha tells them her parents are divorcing, and the girls make a pact to always be there for one another.

They go to the cemetery to perform one last seance to put Dear Johnny's soul to rest. His tombstone suddenly rises surrounded by bright light and a figure appears from behind. It turns out to just be the groundskeeper, who chastises the girls for "playing" in the cemetery and explains the damaged tombstone is being replaced because he was the one who cracked it. Chrissy then refuses to participate in future seances, deeming them a waste of time. The entire ordeal prompts Samantha to realize her childhood is coming to an end.

While leaving, Samantha notices Crazy Pete going to the tombstone. Realizing he is Peter, she comforts him, while he advises her not to dwell on things. Some time after, the tree house is finally bought, and Samantha narrates, "The treehouse was supposed to bring us more independence. But what the summer actually brought was independence from each other."

The film returns to 1991, where Chrissy goes into labor and gives birth to a baby girl. Later, in their old tree house, Roberta reveals that Crazy Pete died the previous year and Samantha confesses Pete was Dear Johnny's father. The friends reaffirm their pact and vow to remain close.

Cast

Main characters
 Samantha Albertson (Gaby Hoffmann/Demi Moore) narrates the film. She believes in the paranormal and conducts the seances in the cemetery with her friends, who for the most part believe it to be all pretend. From the outside, her home life appears normal with her parents and younger sister, Angela. However, her parents had been having marital issues for some time now, much to the point that it had reached a level of consistency that never seemed to bother her. However, this came to an abrupt change when one night, her father moves out, and within a few weeks she learns her mother is seeing another man named Bud Kent. As an adult, she is a popular science-fiction author who has commitment issues. At age 12, she was the most invested in the mystery of Dear Johnny, whose spirit the girls believe they have resurrected from his tombstone. She alone learns the truth behind his death, and receives valuable advice that later helps her come to terms with her current struggles in life.
 Roberta Martin (Christina Ricci/Rosie O'Donnell) is the proclaimed tomboy of the girls, stemming primarily from her upbringing in a family consisting of her father and three older brothers, her mother having been killed in a car accident when she was four. She tapes her breasts to flatten them, plays sports, and never hesitates to fight a boy. She usually leads the girls in their rivalry with the Wormer brothers, but eventually shares a kiss with Scott. Afterward, she no longer tapes her breasts, indicating that she accepts that she is growing into a woman. Her struggle to come to terms with her mother's death is highlighted in the film when she fakes her own death before her friends by pretending to have drowned while they were swimming, as well as in another instance in which Samantha recalls her having jumped off the roof and pretended to have broken her neck earlier that summer. As an adult, she is an obstetrician and lives with her boyfriend. At the end of the film, she delivers Chrissy's baby. Although it is never shown or mentioned who her boyfriend is the film hints that it might be Scott.
 Chrissy DeWitt (Ashleigh Aston Moore/Rita Wilson) was raised by an overbearing, fastidious mother (Bonnie Hunt) who sheltered her. Her naivete, particularly about all things sexual, is often laughed at by her friends. She is the "good girl", who chastises the others for cussing (as children and adults). Being the most responsible, she closely monitors the "tree house money" they are saving. She always questions the others' schemes, but is fiercely loyal to them.  As an adult, she marries the nerdy Morton Williams, and they live in her childhood home and later have a baby girl. The pending birth of her first child brings Samantha and Teeny back to their hometown.
 Tina "Teeny" Tercell (Thora Birch/Melanie Griffith) lives with her rich country club parents who are rarely around, which according to Samantha's narration is, "a typical upbringing for actors and pathological liars". She loves glamour, dressing up, and using makeup, and watches the films at the drive-in movie from her rooftop. Among the girls, she is the most interested in sexuality and boys and often flirts. She desires a bigger bust, and has breast implants when she's an adult. She is now a successful actress and has had multiple marriages. The limousine she arrives in is later used to transport Chrissy to the hospital when she goes into labor.

Supporting

 Devon Sawa as Scott Wormer, one of the Wormer brothers who bullies the girls, but later reforms and shares a kiss with Roberta.
 Lolita Davidovich as Mrs. Albertson, mother of Samantha and Angela who recently got divorced and gets a new boyfriend, Bud Kent.
 Rumer Willis as Angela Albertson (credited as Willa Glen), sister of Samantha who misses her father dearly but takes a quick liking to her mother's new boyfriend, Bud Kent.
 Cloris Leachman as Grandma Albertson, mother of Mr. Albertson and grandmother of Samantha and Angela. She becomes very upset when her son leaves and worries dearly about her granddaughters. She is an avid poker and bingo player.
 Hank Azaria as Bud Kent, Mrs. Albertson's boyfriend whom she gets after her husband leaves. Angela takes a quick liking to him but Samantha doesn't. He volunteers to take them to the Smithsonian Institution in Washington D.C.
 Bonnie Hunt as Mrs. DeWitt, mother of Chrissy who shelters her and uses plants and gardening to explain sex to her and also informs her that all hippies are sex fiends.  
 Janeane Garofalo as Wiladene, a diner waitress and spiritual reader and adviser who the girls visit to tell them that they've been contacted by Dear Johnny's spirit to which she tells them that he and his mother, Beverly Anne, were murdered.
 Walter Sparrow as Crazy Pete, an old man who only comes out at night and scares the girls but they later learn he is nice after he rescues Samantha. He is later revealed to be Peter Sims, the father of Jonathan and husband of Beverly Anne.
 Bradley Coryell as Clay Wormer, one of the Wormer brothers who bullies the girls. 
 Travis Robertson as Roger Wormer, one of the Wormer brothers who bullies the girls.
 Justin Humphrey as Eric Wormer, one of the Wormer brothers who bullies the girls. 
 Brendan Fraser as the Vietnam veteran (uncredited), a soldier who fought in Vietnam whom the girls meet while riding their bikes and whom Samantha might have developed a crush on. He informs them that although their parents are adults they're not always right.

Release

Box office 
Now and Then was released in North American theaters on October 20, 1995, ultimately grossing $37.5 million worldwide. In its opening weekend, it debuted in the number two spot behind Get Shorty and above the thriller Seven.

Critical reception 
On Rotten Tomatoes, Now and Then has a 33% approval rating based on reviews from 21 critics, with an average rating of 5.2/10. On Metacritic, it has a score of 50% based on reviews from 23 critics, indicating "mixed or average reviews."

Roger Ebert of the Chicago Sun-Times criticized the story, saying it was "made of artificial bits and pieces" whereas "What distinguished Stand by Me was the psychological soundness of the story: We could believe it and care about it." Ebert instead praised another film about girlhood The Man in the Moon for its truthful storytelling and said that in comparison this film was "a gimmicky sitcom." Alison Macor of The Austin Chronicle wrote the film is “sweet and it's often funny, but ultimately its slice-of-life approach tries too hard to incorporate current events like the Vietnam War.”

Though critics were lukewarm towards the story, multiple reviews praised the four young leads’ acting. Macor acknowledged “the four young actresses effectively convey that on-the-verge feeling between puberty and teen-hood”. In a positive review, Edward Guthmann of the San Francisco Chronicle wrote Now and Then “nicely captures the giddiness, excitement and resistance to adult responsibility that are specific to 12-year-old girls. It's not particularly deep, but it's a good-natured, sprightly comedy that ought to find its most appreciative audience among preteen girls.”

Legacy 

In the years since Now and Thens release, the film has gained a large cult following through home video, repeat airings on cable TV, and as a staple at girls’ sleepovers.

In a New York Times piece discussing the film’s cultural impact, Ilana Kaplan wrote Now and Then was ahead of its time for “giving the complexities of girlhood a weight that coming-of-age films [had heretofore] typically neglected…[The film] showed tween girls as fully realized characters who weren’t written off or secondary. Tackling death and grief, along with budding sexuality gave their stories weight when narratives about female adolescence were often surface-level.”

Screenwriter I. Marlene King went on to create the drama series Pretty Little Liars, which she said is influenced by Now and Then. King would reunite with director Lesli Linka Glatter for Liars, with the latter directing the pilot episode and two season finales. Though King announced in 2012 she would be developing Now and Then as a series for ABC Family, the project did not come to materialize. According to King, ABC Family wanted to change the concept "so the 'now' was present day and the 'then' would be the ‘90s. I didn’t want to do that — I felt that kind of ruins how special the movie is...I didn’t want to take a chance on changing the time period. To me, there will never be a 1970s again, so to try to set it in the ‘90s when we had cell phones and things like that, I don’t think it would work."

Soundtrack
Columbia Records released a soundtrack album on October 10, 1995. It was made up of tunes from the 1960s and 1970s.

The following songs appear in the film, but not on the soundtrack:
 "Midnight Rider" by The Allman Brothers Band
 "These Boots Are Made For Walkin'" by Nancy Sinatra

One of the songs is anachronistic for a story set in the summer of 1970: "Knock Three Times" was released in 1971.

 "Sugar, Sugar" – The Archies (2:45)
 "Knock Three Times" – Tony Orlando and Dawn (2:54)
 "I Want You Back" – The Jackson 5 (2:53)
 "Signed, Sealed, Delivered I'm Yours" – Stevie Wonder (2:39)
 "Band of Gold" – Freda Payne (2:53)
 "Daydream Believer" – The Monkees (2:49)
 "No Matter What" – Badfinger (2:59)
 "Hitchin' a Ride" – Vanity Fare (2:55)
 "All Right Now" – Free (5:29)
 "I'm Gonna Make You Love Me" – Supremes/Temptations (3:06)
 "I'll Be There" – The Jackson 5 (3:56)
 "Now and Then" – Susanna Hoffs (5:34)

Varèse Sarabande issued an album of Cliff Eidelman's score on October 24, 1995.

 "Main Title" (3:05)
 "Remembrance" (1:57)
 "A Secret Meeting" (2:11)
 "On the Swing" (1:26)
 "It's My Mom" (2:32)
 "Spirits Are Here" (2:17)
 "Sam's Dad Leaves" (1:56)
 "It's a Girl" (1:48)
 "Roberta Fakes Death" (1:26)
 "Best Friends for Life" (3:07)
 "Pete Saves Sam" (2:29)
 "The Pact" (3:10)
 "No More Seances" (1:44)
 "Rest in Peace Johnny" (4:22)

References

External links
 
 

1995 films
1995 comedy-drama films
1995 directorial debut films
1990s buddy comedy-drama films
1990s coming-of-age comedy-drama films
1990s English-language films
1990s female buddy films
1990s teen comedy-drama films
1990s pregnancy films
American buddy comedy films
American coming-of-age comedy-drama films
American female buddy films
American pregnancy films
American teen comedy-drama films
Films about puberty
Films directed by Lesli Linka Glatter
Films produced by Demi Moore
Films produced by Suzanne Todd
Films scored by Cliff Eidelman
Films set in 1970
Films set in 1995
Films set in Indiana
Films shot in Savannah, Georgia
New Line Cinema films
1990s American films